Thomas “Tom” Rogers is a media/technology executive who founded CNBC and MSNBC Rogers played a major role in television's transition to the digital era, managing the rollout of innovations like TiVo, as well as bringing digital media companies like Netflix and Amazon (company) to the TV screen. Rogers oversaw numerous media brands like New York Magazine and the Arts & Entertainment and History channels. His career has operated at the nexus of media, technology and public policy for more than three decades.



Education 

Tom is a graduate of Wesleyan University and Columbia Law School. He serves on the Dean’s Council of Columbia Law School, and the joint Columbia Law School/Columbia Business School Richman Center.

Career

Engine Gaming & Media Inc. 
Rogers is Executive Chairman of Engine Media, Inc., a publicly traded company (TSXV: Game). Engine Media was created in May 2020, from the merger of 3 companies: WinView Games, Torque Esports, and Frankly Media. Engine Media provides game of skill offerings for both traditional sports and esports, as well as data services for those looking to navigate the gaming sector, as well as game publishing. It also provides advertising and content management solutions in the mobile and connected TV space. Engine Media's operating brands include Stream Hatchet, the esports data service; UMG (Ultimate Multiparty Gaming), a gaming competition platform; Eden Games, a mobile game publisher with particular expertise in the auto racing space; WinView (see below); and Frankly Media (see below).

Newsweek 
Rogers is Editor-at-Large for Newsweek, and writes columns on policy and political issues for Newsweek.

WinView, Inc. 

Appointed in May 2016, Rogers was the current executive chairman of WinView, Inc., a Silicon Valley company, until the merger creating Engine Media. WinView invented and operates a platform that joins components of TV sports, social media, gaming and mobility. Holding 68 patents, WinView is a leading player in “second-screen interactive sports TV,” where viewers can engage in interactive gaming centered on a particular televised sporting event while simultaneously watching live TV sports. About his role at WinView, Front Office Sports has said that, "Before TiVo, there was CNBC. Behind both was Tom Rogers. Now growing a new company, WinView, where he sits as executive chairman, he is on a path to continue innovating within the media landscape."

Frankly, Inc. 

Rogers was appointed in March 2017 as chairman of Frankly, Inc., a publicly traded company that manages the digital and mobile news distribution for local broadcast stations and other media properties, including Newsweek, throughout the United States. He served in this capacity until the merger creating Engine Media.

Captify, Limited 

Rogers is chairman of Captify, Limited, a UK based advertising technology company with offices in New York, Paris and Madrid. He was appointed chairman in January, 2018. Captify’s primary offering is a leading semantic technology, while aggregating over 40 billion pieces of internet search data a month to enable major brands around the world to effectively target their marketing efforts.

Frequency, Inc. 

Rogers serves on the board of Frequency, Inc, a company that provides cable, satellite and OTT content operators user interface and meta data for the organization, menuing and presentation of digital and linear video content offerings.

TRget Media, LLC 

Rogers currently serves as chairman of TRget Media, LLC, a media investment and operations advisory firm.

CNBC 

Rogers has been a frequent guest on business news channels including CNBC, Fox Business Network, Bloomberg TV, and MSNBC. Notable appearances include CNBC's Squawk on the Street, CNBC's Mad Money with Jim Cramer, CNBC's Fast Money (talk show), and Fox Business Network's Countdown to the Closing Bell, and MSNBC's Morning Joe. He is now a CNBC contributor.

TiVo, Inc. 

For eleven years, from 2005 to 2016, Rogers served as president and CEO of TiVo, Inc., the longest such tenure in the company's history. TiVo has been seen as vastly changing television viewing behavior through its invention of the DVR. TiVo was sold to Rovi in 2016 at which point Rovi adopted the TiVo name.

PRIMEDIA, Inc. 

Before TiVo, Rogers was chairman and CEO of PRIMEDIA Inc., which was then the leading targeted media company in the United States. PRIMEDIA published some 200 magazines, including New York Magazine, operated more than 400 websites, and owned a wide range of television and video businesses.

NBC Universal Cable 

Rogers was the first president of NBC Cable (now NBCUniversal Cable) and executive vice president of NBC, as well as NBC’s chief strategist. Among his many accomplishments, Rogers founded CNBC, the nation’s leading business news channel and established the NBC/Microsoft cable channel and internet joint venture, MSNBC.

As the first president of NBC Cable Rogers was involved in the establishment of National Geographic Channel, Court TV (now truTV) and Independent Film Channel, and served as co-chairman of the board of A&E Television Networks and The History Channel for 10 years. In addition, he oversaw American Movie Classics, Bravo (U.S. TV network), and several regional sports channels. During his 2013 induction into the Broadcasting & Cable Hall of Fame, Jack Welch, former chairman and CEO of General Electric, said: "Tom came in to, if you will, to put NBC in the cable business. At NBC, no one had respect for cable, they were broadcasters and never the twain shall meet. Those two words didn’t go together easily. He legitimized it. He made it a place to be."Lesley Stahl of CBS News, in announcing his induction into the Broadcasting & Cable Hall of Fame, said, "Rogers is a guy who gets things done... and he transforms companies along the way."

U.S. House of Representatives Telecommunications, Consumer Protection and Finance Subcommittee 

Prior to NBC, Rogers was senior counsel to the U.S. House of Representatives Telecommunications, Consumer Protection and Finance Subcommittee, where he was responsible for drafting a number of communications laws including the Cable Franchise Policy and Communications Act of 1984, which established the federal regulatory framework for the cable industry, and for overseeing the Federal Communications Commission (FCC).

Additional career 

Rogers has also served as the senior operating executive for media and entertainment for Cerberus Capital Management, a large private equity firm, and as chairman of the board of Teleglobe (now VSNL International Canada), a leading international telecommunications, voice-over-internet, and mobile telephony provider.

Rogers also served as vice chairman of Supermedia (NYSE: SPMD), which was created by the spinoff of Verizon Communications Yellow Pages print and digital business.

Rogers began his career as an attorney with a Wall Street law firm.

Awards

Cable Hall of Fame 

Rogers was inducted into the Cable Hall of Fame in 2016. Morning Joe hosts Mika Brzezinski and Joe Scarborough said, "He started MSNBC and took TiVo by storm... Tom is a legend."

Emmy Awards 

He is also the winner of Emmy Awards for his contributions to the development of advanced television and advanced advertising. Tom was also inducted as a Cable Pioneer. Tom served for four years as president of the International Television Academy.

References 

American television executives
American entertainment industry businesspeople
Living people
Wesleyan University alumni
Columbia Law School alumni
People from Scarsdale, New York
Scarsdale High School alumni
Emmy Award winners
Year of birth missing (living people)
Newsweek people